In United Kingdom aviation, a purple corridor is an area kept free from commercial or other aircraft to allow for the passage of royal or other VIP aircraft. It includes a stipulation that no plane takes off or leaves within 20 minutes of a royal plane.

See also
Prohibited airspace

References

Air traffic control in the United Kingdom
Aviation in the United Kingdom